Ingerophrynus quadriporcatus is a species of toad in the family Bufonidae. Its common names are long-glanded toad, four-ridged toad and greater Malacca toad. It is found in Peninsular Malaysia, Singapore, Borneo (Sabah, Brunei, Sarawak, and Kalimantan), Sumatra, and the Natuna Islands.
Its natural habitats are swamp forests, but it has also been found on rubber plantations. It breeds in standing water.

Description
They have a distinct tympanum. The dorsum is dark or light brown above and on sides, usually uniform in colour, and without distinct markings. Ventral colour is yellowish brown, possibly with dark spots. Skin on top of head and body is covered with many conical spines.

Conservation
Ingerophrynus quadriporcatus may be common in suitable swampy habitats, but it is not abundant. It is threatened by habitat loss caused by expanding oil palm plantations, infrastructure development, and logging.

References

quadriporcatus
Amphibians of Brunei
Amphibians of Indonesia
Amphibians of Malaysia
Amphibians of Singapore
Amphibians of Borneo
Fauna of Sumatra
Amphibians described in 1887
Taxa named by George Albert Boulenger
Taxonomy articles created by Polbot